Susan Kushner is a fictional character in the Ramona series of novels by Beverly Cleary.

Fictional character biography
A girl named Susan appears in Beezus and Ramona at Ramona's party, although it's never specified whether or not she's Susan Kushner. When Ramona Quimby starts kindergarten and when she first pulls her hair, they become rivals through much of the series. In Ramona the Pest, Susan's S's look like worms crawling, as many students with S's in their names are in Miss Binney's class. She has long curls described as blonde in Ramona's World, although Ramona the Pest describes Susan's hair color as "a sort of reddish brown".

Relationship between Susan and Ramona
Susan is portrayed as being somewhat snobby and overachieving; in the book of her debut, her beautiful curls become the object of Ramona's fascination and lead to the girl's suspension from kindergarten for pulling the curls out of curiosity. In the following book, set a year later, Susan copies a stereotypically-designed wise paper bag owl designed by Ramona during an arts and crafts session, which is destroyed by an enraged Ramona after Susan is praised by the entire classroom for her work. She is depicted as a typical perfectionist; well-behaved in class, calm, and hard-working, as opposed to Ramona's active imagination and unintentionally troublemaking personality. However, she is a bit of a snob, exaggerating the pain felt after Ramona tugged her curly hair in Ramona the Pest for attention. In the final book of the series, she refuses a slice of cake during Ramona's birthday celebration claiming that it is probably unhygienic and eating an apple instead, but soon afterward she confesses, in tears, her lifelong striving for perfection among adults, and her relationship with Ramona seems to improve afterward. In the same book, it is revealed that her parents tell Ramona to "be nice".

Film
In the 2010 film Ramona and Beezus, Susan is portrayed by Sierra McCormick and seen as more of a bully than anywhere else in the series. She is portrayed as being conceited, auditioning to star in television advertisements for a well-known brand of peanut butter as its princess mascot, donning a tiara at school, albeit whether or not she was selected for the part is unknown.

Beverly Cleary characters
Child characters in literature
Female characters in literature
Literary characters introduced in 1955